Robert Planel (2 January 1908 – 25 May 1994) was a French composer, music pedagogue and violinist.

Life 
Born in Montélimar, Planel was the son of the founder (1903) and director of the music school in Montélimar, Alphonse Planel (1869-1947), who himself from 1902 to 1947 was conductor of the Harmonie municipale "La Lyre" montilienne and also composer. Planel received violin lessons with René Chédécal, then 1st violinist of the Orchestre de l'Opéra national de Paris. From 1922 to 1933 he studied at the Conservatoire de Paris with, among others, Firmin Touche (1875-1957) (violin), Jean Gallon (1878-1959) (harmony), Georges Caussade (1873-1936) (counterpoint) and with Henri Büsser (1872-1973) and Paul Vidal (1863-1931) (musical composition). During his studies he worked as a violinist in prominent cinemas in the French capital.

In 1933 he won the prestigious Prix de Rome for his cantata Idylle funambulesque. As a result, he was able to study and work from 1934 to 1936 in Rome at the "Académie de France" in the Villa Medici.

After the Second World War, he was Inspector General of the City of Paris and had great merits for structuring the musical training institutes. From 1972 to 1974, he was one of the co-founders of the urban conservatories of Paris and of the Paris region.

As a composer he wrote for various genres.

Compositions

Works for orchestra 
 1936: Divertissement chorégraphique, symphonic poem for orchestra
 1937: Caprice, concertino for cello and piano with orchestra
 1938: L'Anniversaire de l’infante, for orchestra
 1946: Trois pièces de ballet, for orchestra
 Les Petites danseuses sévillanes
 Menuet
 Saltarelle
 1953-1954: Parade, for orchestra
 1956: Ballet pour Nanou, for orchestra
 1966: Concert, for trumpet and string orchestra (dedicated to Maurice André)
 Thème varié, for orchestra

Works for wind orchestra 
 La roche du midi, ouverture
 Marguerite des Prés, fantasy
 Rochecourbière, ouverture
 Scènes villagoises, suite

Masses and sacred music 
 1932: Pâques romaines, for mixed choir
 1936: Notre père qui êtes aux cieux, for tenor and organ - in memory of Rolland Gérardin
 1937-1939: Psaume, for mixed choir and orchestra
 1993-1994: Psaume, in three movements for tenor solo, mixed choir, organ and orchestra

Cantatas 
 1933: Idylle funambulesque, cantata for tenor, baritone, soprano and orchestra - after a poem by Paul Arosa
 1986: La Cantate des Merveilles, cantata for mixed choir

Music theatre

Stage music 
 1958 Giboulin et Giboulette, conte musical - lyrics: Jean Planel

Works for choir 
 1932: Les Chasseresses, for women's choir and piano - lyrics: Jean Royère
 1935: Menons le cortège funèbre, for mixed choir - lyrics: A. Praviel
 1935: Saluons la demeure, for women's choir, piano and orchestra - lyrics: A. Prariel
 1955-1956: Chanson de route, for mixed choir
 1958: Nous n'irons plus au bois, for mixed choir
 Quatre Noëls, for four equal voices and harp (or piano)
 La jambe me fait mal
 O douce nuit
 Nous étions trois Bergerettes
 Et Bon, Bon, Bon
 Ecoutez tous bergers, for mixed choir and piano

Vocal music 
 1931: Les Biches, for soprano and three female voices (soprano, mezzo-soprano, contralto) and orchestra - lyrics: Anna de Noailles
 1931: Nymphea, for voice and orchestra
 1932: Après la tempête, song and fugue based on a theme by Georges Hue
 1932: Sérénade à Bettine, song for tenor and small orchestra - after a poem by Alfred de Musset
 1932 Soir, for tenor and piano - lyrics: Albert Samain
 1933: La Mare, for tenor and piano - lyrics: Théophile Gautier
 1933 Les Rêves d’amour, for voice and small orchestra - lyrics: F. Beissier
 1933 Fin de journée, for tenor and orchestra (or piano) - lyrics: Henri de Régnier
 1935 Quatre mélodies, for soprano and orchestra (or piano)
 Le Marchand de sable   - lyrics: Jacques Fourcade
 Berceuse de la Poupée  - lyrics: Tristan Klingsor
 Le Fossoyeur
 à son page - lyrics: Pierre de Ronsard
 1936: Adorons cette croix
 1936: Deux oiseaux
 1938: Évasion de la jeunesse, four lieder - lyrics: Claude Chardon
 Donnez-nous le printemps
 La mer
 La montagne
 Dansons une vaste ronde
 Sur le pont de Nantes
 1947: La Poupée d’Hyde Park, for voices
 A Cassandre, for tenor and piano (or orchestra) - lyrics: Pierre de Ronsard
 Il était un roi, lied - lyrics: Maurice Carême
 Soleil couchant, for voice and orchestra (or piano) - lyrics: José Maria de Heredia

Chamber music 
 1930: Pièce, for violin and piano
 1931: Andante et scherzo, trio for oboe, bassoon and piano
 1932-1935: String quartet
 1937-1939: Burlesque, for saxophone quartet
 1944: Prélude et danse, for oboe and piano
 1944: Suite Romantique, for alto saxophone and piano
 Sérénade italienne
 Danseuses
 Chanson triste
 Valse sentimentale
 Conte de Noël 
 Chanson du muletier
 1950: Air et final, for bass trombone and piano
 1957: Prelude et Saltarelle, for alto saxophone and piano
 1958: Caprice, for horn and piano
 1960: Danse, for percussion and piano
 1962: A travers champ, for saxophone quartet
 1963: Fantaisie, for viola and piano
 1966: Légende, for horn and piano
 1993-1994: Slow, for flute and piano
 1994: Vocalise, for clarinet and piano
 Chanson romantique, for oboe and piano
 Comme une sérénade, for oboe and piano
 Diverses pièces, for violin and piano
 Suite Enfantine, for violin and piano
 Conte
 Valse
 Berceuse
 Ronde
 Thème, for percussion and piano

Pieces for organ 
 1970: Epythalame
 1982: Prélude, Aria et Final about the old name of Montélimar

Pieces for piano 
 1936: Suite de danses dans le style ancien
 Allemande
 Courante
 Sarabande
 Menuet
 Rigaudon
 Gigue en rondeau
 1987: Rêverie
 1988: Viennoiseries, for two four-handed pianos
 1989: Bagatelles, for piano
 Promenade (to Aurélie)
 Mélancolie (to Anne-Marie)
 Sur la rivière (to Vincent)
 Simple histoire (to Hélène)
 Gambades (to Béatrice)
 Ballerine

Film scores 
 1942: Dans le jardin merveilleux
 1943: Les Métamorphoses de la matière
 1945: Saut périlleux
 1946: Amanda

Bibliography 
 Wolfgang Suppan, Armin Suppan: Das Neue Lexikon des Blasmusikwesens, 4. Auflage, Freiburg-Tiengen, Blasmusikverlag Schulz GmbH, 1994, 
 Jean-Marie Londeix: Musique pour saxophone, volume II : répertoire général des œuvres et des ouvrages d' enseignement pour le saxophone, Cherry Hill: Roncorp Publications, 1985.
 Nicole Lacombe, Alain Lacombe: Des compositeurs pour l'image - (Cinema et Television), Neuilly sur Seine: Musique et promotion editeur, 1982., 602 p.

References

External links 
  Official website
  Catalogue
  Biography
 Robert Planel, Concerto pour trompette (YouTube)

1908 births
1998 deaths
People from Montélimar
Conservatoire de Paris alumni
20th-century French composers
French classical composers
French male classical composers
French music educators
20th-century French male classical violinists
Prix de Rome for composition